Kiss Kiss is a collection of short stories by Roald Dahl, first published in 1960 by Alfred A. Knopf. Most of the constituent stories had been previously published elsewhere.

Contents
It contains the following short stories:

"The Landlady" (first appeared in The New Yorker magazine, November 28, 1959)
"William and Mary" 
"The Way Up to Heaven" (first appeared in The New Yorker magazine, February 27, 1954)
"Parson's Pleasure"
"Mrs. Bixby and the Colonel's Coat"
"Royal Jelly"
"Georgy Porgy"
"Genesis and Catastrophe: A True Story"
"Edward the Conqueror" (first appeared in The New Yorker magazine, October 31, 1953)
"Pig"
"The Champion of the World" (first appeared in The New Yorker magazine, January 31, 1959)

These are some of Dahl's most macabre stories. Delicately, the naive punish the wicked, but also the other way around.

Most of the stories are presented as typical narratives, albeit with imaginative characters. The horror of each story is built around implication, and many horrific endings, involving death or unpleasant situations, can only be inferred, since nothing is directly stated.

"The Champion of the World" is a condensed version of the story that would become Dahl's 1975 children's book Danny the Champion of the World.

Editions
 Knopf, New York, 1960, 309 pp.
 McCleland, Toronto, 1960
 M. Joseph, London, 1960, 255 pp.
 Hayakawa, Japan, 1961, Paperback, Japanese as Tales of Menace 1
 Dell:F128, New York, 1961, 288 pp., paperback
 Bonnier, Stockholm, 1961, Swedish as Puss puss
 Penguin:1832, Harmondsworth, 1962, 233 pp., paperback,  (1973 reprint)
 Feltrinelli, Milano, 1964, 276 pp, Italian as Kiss Kiss: 11 storie macabre (con humour)
 Rowohlt, Reinbek, German as Küsschen, Küsschen

Audiobook
Unabridged recordings have been made of all 11 stories and released by Penguin Audiobooks. These are available individually as audio downloads, or together in a CD collection. The narrators are Stephanie Beacham, Juliet Stevenson, Derek Jacobi, Adrian Scarborough, Stephen Mangan and Tamsin Greig.

Critical response 
Lorna Bradbury, Deputy Literary Editor for The Daily Telegraph, listed the collection as one of "25 Classic Novels for Teenagers." Zoe Chace of NPR told interviewer Cara Philbin her reactions during reading the collection as a child: "Kiss Kiss is for grown-ups...It was actually the marriages that I remember feeling the worst about...Reading Kiss Kiss is one of the first times I can remember a real-life truth staring back at me from a book. I hadn't yet thought about the nasty tricks adults play on each other just to hurt each other. Particularly, married adults who aren't in love and who might know the other's weakness best. My imagination matured."

See also

 Switch Bitch (1974) collection of short stories
 Tales of the Unexpected (book)

References

Further reading

1960 short story collections
Short story collections by Roald Dahl
Alfred A. Knopf books